The 2009-10 season in Hong Kong football, starting July 2009 and ending June 2010:

Overview

Representative team

Hong Kong Team

Asian Cup qualifiers

Hong Kong played in their Asian Cup 2011 qualifying campaign.

East Asian Football Championship semi-final

Guangdong-Hong Kong Cup

Hong Kong's 2–1 win to Guangdong in first leg, Julius Akosah scored two goals in his first game for Hong Kong. However, Guangdong scored two goals by Li Jian in second leg. Guangdong win the Guangdong-Hong Kong Cup. Hong Kong has been stopped to be crown-of-four.

East Asian Football Championship final competition

Hong Kong U-23

East Asian Games

2009 East Asian Games was held in Hong Kong form 2 December 2009 to 13 December 2009. The tournament was won by Hong Kong, who claimed their first international football tournament title. They defeated Japan 4–2 in a penalty shootout in the final, after extra time had finished in a 1–1 draw.

Hong Kong-Macau Interport

Hong Kong U-19

AFC U-19 Championship qualifications

Hong Kong U-16

AFC U-16 Championship qualifications

Honours

Asian clubs competitions

AFC Cup 2009

Eastern
Eastern have no game in 2009–10 season since eliminated in group stage.

South China
South China played AFC Cup 2009 from round of 16. The team eliminated in semi-final.

5–5 on aggregate. South China won on away goals.

Al-Kuwait won 3–1 on aggregate.

AFC Cup 2010

NT Realty Wofoo Tai Po
NT Realty Wofoo Tai Po eliminated in group stage.

South China
South China eliminated in round of 16.

Exhibition matches

Friendly

Panasonic Cup

TSW Pegasus Anniversary Cup

South China 100th Anniversary Invitation Cup

References